The Reno Aces are a Minor League Baseball team of the Pacific Coast League (PCL) and the Triple-A affiliate of the Arizona Diamondbacks. They are located in Reno, Nevada, and play their home games at Greater Nevada Field, which opened in 2009. The Aces have been members of the PCL since 2009, including the 2021 season in which it was known as the Triple-A West. They won the PCL championship in 2012 and 2022. Reno went on to win the Triple-A National Championship Game in 2012.

History

Team origins
The Aces were known as the Tucson Sidewinders from 1998 to 2008. Before that, the team was first known as the Tucson Toros. They were Tucson's Triple-A baseball club, playing at Hi Corbett Field in midtown Tucson from 1969 to 1997. Part of the old ten-team configuration of the Pacific Coast League, the Toros won the PCL Championship in 1991 and 1993. The Toros were preceded by a number of other Tucson teams between 1915 and 1958, such as the Tucson Cowboys and the Tucson Lizards.

After the MLB expansion that added the Arizona Diamondbacks in Phoenix and Tampa Bay Devil Rays, the Toros moved to Fresno, California, as the Fresno Grizzlies. The Phoenix Firebirds relocated to Tucson, briefly became the Tucson Toros (1997), and then became the Sidewinders (1998), the Triple-A affiliate of the new Diamondbacks. This was accomplished by what amounted to a swap in ownership in 1997, with Firebirds owner Martin Stone purchasing the Toros and Toros owner Rick Holtzman receiving interest in the Firebirds. The Tucson team retained management and staff primarily from the Toros, and traces its history from the Toros rather than the Firebirds.

The Sidewinders had humble beginnings, as it was five years before they enjoyed their first winning regular season. They dominated the 2006 season, with the PCL's best record in the regular season and won the Pacific Coast League and National Championships in the postseason.

The Phoenix Firebirds played from 1958 through 1997 as an affiliate of the San Francisco Giants. The franchise joined the Pacific Coast League as a charter member in 1903 as the San Francisco Seals, relocating to Phoenix in 1958 when the major league New York Giants moved to San Francisco. Seals alumni include Joe DiMaggio.

The Tucson Toros have been affiliated with the Chicago White Sox (1969–1972), the Oakland Athletics (1973–1976), the Texas Rangers (1977–1979), the Houston Astros (1980–1996), and the Milwaukee Brewers (1997 only, with one Diamondbacks prospect, Travis Lee, playing with them by special arrangement). At the time of the change in venue and affiliation (1998), the name Sidewinders was chosen from a contest.

The Toros became a member of the independent Golden Baseball League, adopting their previous Triple-A history from 1969 to 1997. The Aces adopted the Sidewinders' history from 1998 to 2008 before the franchise was moved to Reno. The Toros folded in 2011 after the AAA Portland Beavers moved to town to become the Tucson Padres.  The Padres moved again in 2014, this time to Texas to become the El Paso Chihuahuas.

A new era – Reno Aces

In 2006 the team was sold to Manhattan Capital Sports Fund lead by Stuart Katzoff and Jerry Katzoff, later in  2007 it was formally announced that the Sidewinders would be moving to Reno after the 2008 season. A new 9,100-capacity venue, Greater Nevada Field, was constructed for the team in downtown Reno.

The move forced the Reno Silver Sox of the independent Golden Baseball League to fold.  The franchise dropped the name "Sidewinders" in place of a new identity. Some fans suggested that the team should adopt or purchase the rights to the Silver Sox name from the GBL for the new PCL club, but that was ruled out as that team was, at that point (prior to folding), likely to relocate to Carson City. The Reno Aces introduced their new team name and logo at a press conference on September 23, 2008.  The nickname has a dual meaning:  "ace" is a baseball slang term for a team's top pitcher, and the ace is the highest card in several card games (a reference to Nevada's legalized gambling history). The logo features the diamonds symbol, which can be seen as another gambling reference, as well as to the diamond of a baseball field and the MLB affiliate's name.

The Reno Aces were due to begin their inaugural season in 2009 on the road against the Salt Lake Bees on Thursday, April 9.  However, the game was postponed due to the death of Los Angeles Angels' Nick Adenhart (a Salt Lake alumnus), who was killed by a hit-and-run driver earlier in the day.  Adenhart had played for the Bees during the 2008 season, and was remembered the next day in what was originally the second game in a four-game series between the Aces and the Bees.  The Bees beat the Aces 6–2 on Friday, April 10. The Aces won their home opener at Greater Nevada Field on Friday, April 17, 11–1 against the Salt Lake Bees, to an over-capacity sell-out crowd of 9,167.

The Aces made the playoffs for the first time in 2011, but lost the fifth and deciding game in the first round to the Sacramento River Cats. The Aces made it back to the post-season the following year in 2012, defeated Sacramento in five games, and the Omaha Storm Chasers in four to win the PCL title. Reno then won the Triple-A National Championship Game, defeating the Pawtucket Red Sox 10–3 at Durham Bulls Athletic Park in North Carolina.

The Reno Aces hosted the Triple-A All-Star Game on July 17, 2013.

In conjunction with Major League Baseball's restructuring of Minor League Baseball in 2021, the Aces were organized into the Triple-A West. Reno ended the season in second place in the Western Division with a 69–49 record. No playoffs were held to determine a league champion; instead, the team with the best regular-season record was declared the winner. However, 10 games that had been postponed from the start of the season were reinserted into the schedule as a postseason tournament called the Triple-A Final Stretch in which all 30 Triple-A clubs competed for the highest winning percentage. Reno finished the tournament in 28th place with a 1–5 record. In 2022, the Triple-A West became known as the Pacific Coast League, the name historically used by the regional circuit prior to the 2021 reorganization.

Manager Gil Velazquez led the 2022 Aces to win the Western Division title with a league-best 85–63 record. They then defeated the El Paso Chihuahuas, winners of the Eastern Division, in a single playoff game, 6–2, to win their second PCL championship. Reno faced the Durham Bulls for the Triple-A championship, but they were defeated, 10–6.

Season-by-season records

Roster

Notable alumni
Trevor Bauer, pitcher
Archie Bradley, pitcher
Patrick Corbin, pitcher
Adam Eaton, outfielder
Mitch Haniger, outfielder
Ender Inciarte, outfielder
Jake Lamb, third baseman
Wade Miley, pitcher
Chris Owings, shortstop, 2nd baseman
A. J. Pollock, outfielder
Brett Butler, manager

Minor league affiliations

See also
Current and former Reno Aces players (2009–present)

References

External links
 
 Statistics from Baseball-Reference

 
Pacific Coast League teams
Sports in Reno, Nevada
Professional baseball teams in Nevada
Arizona Diamondbacks minor league affiliates
Baseball teams established in 2009
2009 establishments in Nevada
Triple-A West teams